Sidley railway station is a closed railway station In Sidley, East Sussex. It was on the Bexhill West branch of the Hastings line from Tunbridge Wells. It was opened by the South Eastern and Chatham Railway and was operated by the Southern Region of British Railways on closing. All the station buildings and platforms were demolished soon after closure.  The goods shed was the last railway building on the site which was demolished in 2009 having been derelict for many years. The cutting where the station was situated was infilled to about platform level and the levelled land used by a motorbike training centre which closed in 2012. Work started in January 2013 on construction of a new Bexhill to Hastings link road which has been built along the trackbed through the site of the platforms and opened in 2015.

References

External links
Disused Stations-Sidley

Disused railway stations in East Sussex
Former South Eastern Railway (UK) stations
Railway stations in Great Britain opened in 1902
Railway stations in Great Britain closed in 1917
Railway stations in Great Britain opened in 1920
Railway stations in Great Britain closed in 1964
Beeching closures in England
Buildings and structures demolished in 2009
Bexhill-on-Sea